Robert Lawrence Stine (born October 8, 1943), sometimes known as Jovial Bob Stine and Eric Affabee, is an American novelist, short story writer, television producer, screenwriter, and executive editor.

Stine has been referred to as the "Stephen King of children's literature" and is the author of hundreds of horror fiction novels, including the books in the Fear Street, Goosebumps, Rotten School, Mostly Ghostly and The Nightmare Room series. Some of his other works include a Space Cadets trilogy, two Hark gamebooks, and dozens of joke books. As of 2008, Stine's books have sold over 400 million copies.

Early life 

Stine was born on October 8, 1943 in Columbus, Ohio, the son of Lewis Stine, a shipping clerk, and Anne Feinstein. He grew up in Bexley, Ohio. He comes from a Jewish family. Stine began writing at age nine, when he found a typewriter in his attic, subsequently beginning to type stories and joke books. According to the documentary Tales from the Crypt: From Comic Books to Television, R.L. Stine said that he remembered reading the popular/infamous Tales from the Crypt comic books when he was young and credited them as one of his inspirations. He graduated from Ohio State University in 1965 with a Bachelor of Arts in English. While at OSU, R. L. Stine edited the OSU humor magazine The Sundial for three out of his four years there. He later moved to New York City to pursue his career as a writer.

Career
Stine wrote dozens of humor books for kids under the name Jovial Bob Stine and created the humor magazine Bananas. Bananas was written for teenagers and published by Scholastic Press for 72 issues between 1975 and 1984, plus various "Yearbooks" and paperback books. Stine was editor and responsible for much of the writing (other contributors included writers Robert Leighton, Suzanne Lord and Jane Samuels and artists Sam Viviano, Samuel B. Whitehead, Bob K. Taylor, Bryan Hendrix, Bill Basso, and Howard Cruse). Recurring features included "Hey – Lighten Up!", "It Never Fails!", "Phone Calls", "Joe" (a comic strip by John Holmstrom), "Phil Fly", "Don't You Wish...", "Doctor Duck", "The Teens of Ferret High", "First Date" (a comic strip by Alyse Newman), and "Ask Doctor Si N. Tific".

In 1986, Stine wrote his first horror novel, called Blind Date. He followed with many other novels, including The Babysitter, Beach House, Hit and Run, and The Girlfriend. He was also the co-creator and head writer for the Nickelodeon children's television series Eureeka's Castle, original episodes of which aired as part of the Nick Jr. programming block during the 1989–1995 seasons.

In 1989, Stine started writing Fear Street books. Before launching the Goosebumps series, Stine authored three humorous science fiction books in the Space Cadets series titled Jerks in Training, Bozos on Patrol, and Losers in Space. In 1992, Stine and Parachute Press went on to launch Goosebumps.

Also produced was a Goosebumps TV series that ran for four seasons from 1995 to 1998 and three video games; Escape from HorrorLand, Attack of the Mutant and Goosebumps HorrorLand. In 1995, Stine's first novel targeted at adults, called Superstitious, was published. He has since published three other adult-oriented novels: The Sitter, Eye Candy, and Red Rain.

In the first decade of the 21st century, Stine worked on installments of five different book series, Mostly Ghostly, Rotten School, Fear Street, The Nightmare Room, Goosebumps Horrorland and the stand-alone novels Dangerous Girls (2003) and The Taste of Night (2004). Also, a direct-to-DVD movie The Haunting Hour Volume One: Don't Think About It. Starring Emily Osment, the film was released by Universal Home Entertainment on September 4, 2007 and was successful enough to spawn a spin-off, anthology, TV series R. L. Stine's The Haunting Hour.

In 2014, Stine brought the Fear Street books back with his novel Party Games. The release of the Fear Street novel Give Me a K-I-L-L took place in 2017. Jack Black portrayed a fictionalized version of Stine in the 2015 film Goosebumps, while Stine himself made a cameo appearance in the film, playing a teacher named "Mr. Black". In the film's sequel, Goosebumps 2: Haunted Halloween (2018), Stine had another cameo, as Principal Harrison, while Black reprised his role as Stine in several scenes. A Fear Street trilogy of films was released by Netflix in 2021.

In 2019, Stine appeared on an episode of the children's TV series Arthur. In "Fright Night," which aired in the 23rd season of the show, Stine voices Bob Baxter, the uncle of main character Buster Baxter. In the episode, Bob is shown to moonlight as a writer of scary stories, alluding to his real-life career as the author of the Goosebumps series.

Awards and recognition
According to Forbes List of the 40 best-paid Entertainers of 1996–97, Stine placed 36th with an income of $41 million for the fiscal year. His books have sold over 400 million copies worldwide as of 2008, landing on many bestseller lists. In three consecutive years during the 1990s, USA Today named Stine as America's number one best-selling author.

Among the awards he has received are the 2002 Champion of Reading Award from the Free Public Library of Philadelphia (that award's first year), the Disney Adventures Kids' Choice Award for Best Book-Mystery/Horror (three-time recipient) and the Nickelodeon Kids' Choice Awards (also received three times). During the 1990s, Stine was listed on People Weeklys "Most Intriguing People" list, and in 2003, the Guinness Book of World Records named Stine as the best-selling children's book series author of all time. He won the Thriller Writers of America Silver Bullet Award in 2007, and the Horror Writers Association's Lifetime Achievement Award in 2014. His stories have even inspired R. L. Stine's Haunted Lighthouse, 4D movie-based attractions at SeaWorld (San Antonio and San Diego) and Busch Gardens (Williamsburg and Tampa).

In 2017, Stine was awarded the Inkpot Award.

Personal life
On June 22, 1969, Stine married Jane Waldhorn, an editor and writer who later co-founded Parachute Press in 1983. The couple's only child, Matthew (born June 7, 1980), works in the music industry.

Bibliography

Original series

Goosebumps

Goosebumps (Original Series) 

 Welcome to Dead House (1992)
 Stay Out of the Basement (1992)
 Monster Blood (1992)
 Say Cheese and Die! (1992)
 The Curse of the Mummy’s Tomb (1993)
 Let’s Get Invisible! (1993)
 Night of the Living Dummy (1993)
 The Girl Who Cried Monster (1993)
 Welcome to Camp Nightmare (1993)
 The Ghost Next Door (1993)
 The Haunted Mask (1993)
 Be Careful What You Wish For (1993)
 Piano Lessons Can Be Murder (1993)
 The Werewolf of Fever Swamp (1993)
 You Can’t Scare Me! (1994)
 One Day at HorrorLand (1994)
 Why I’m Afraid of Bees (1994)
 Monster Blood II (1994)
 Deep Trouble  (1994)
 The Scarecrow Walks at Midnight (1994)
 Go Eat Worms! (1994)
 Ghost Beach (1994)
 Return of the Mummy (1994)
 Phantom of the Auditorium (1994)
 Attack of the Mutant (1994)
 My Hairiest Adventure (1994)
 A Night in Terror Tower (1995)
 The Cuckoo Clock of Doom (1995)
 Monster Blood III (1995)
 It Came from Beneath the Sink! (1995)
 Night of the Living Dummy II (1995)
 The Barking Ghost (1995)
 The Horror at Camp Jellyjam (1995)
 Revenge of the Lawn Gnomes (1995)
 A Shocker on Shock Street (1995)
 The Haunted Mask II (1995)
 The Headless Ghost (1995)
 The Abominable Snowman of Pasadena (1995)
 How I Got My Shrunken Head (1996)
 Night of the Living Dummy III (1996)
 Bad Hare Day (1996)
 Egg Monsters from Mars (1996)
 The Beast from the East (1996)
 Say Cheese and Die - Again! (1996)
 Ghost Camp (1996)
 How to Kill a Monster (1996)
 Legend of the Lost Legend (1996)
 Attack of the Jack-O’-Lanterns (1996)
 Vampire Breath (1996)
 Calling All Creeps! (1996)
 Beware, the Snowman (1997)
 How I Learned to Fly (1997)
 Chicken, Chicken (1997)
 Don’t Go to Sleep! (1997)
 The Blob That Ate Everyone! (1997)
 The Curses of Camp Cold Lake (1997)
 My Best Friend is Invisible(1997)
 Deep Trouble II (1997)
 The Haunted School (1997)
 Werewolf Skin (1997)
 I Live in Your Basement! (1997)
 Monster Blood IV (1997)

Tales to Give You Goosebumps Anthologies 
Tales to Give You Goosebumps (1994)
More Tales to Give You Goosebumps (1995)
Even More Tales to Give You Goosebumps (1996)
Still More Tales to Give You Goosebumps (1997)
More and More Tales to Give You Goosebumps (1997)
More and More and More Tales to Give You Goosebumps (1997)

Give Yourself Goosebumps 

 Escape from the Carnival of Horrors (1995)
 Tick Tock, You’re Dead! (1995)
 Trapped in Bat Wing Hall (1995)
 The Deadly Experiments of Dr. Eeek (1996)
 Night in Werewolf Woods (1996) 
 Beware of the Purple Peanut Butter (1996)
 Under the Magician’s Spell (1996)
 The Curse of the Creeping Coffin (1996)
 The Knight in Screaming Armor (1996)
 Diary of a Mad Mummy (1996)
 Deep in the Jungle of Doom (1996)
 Welcome to the Wicked Wax Museum (1996)
 Scream of the Evil Genie (1997)
 The Creepy Creatures of Professor Shock (1997)
 Please Don’t Feed the Vampire! (1997) 
 Secret Agent Grandma (1997)
 Little Comic Shop of Horrors (1997)
 Attack of the Beastly Babysitter (1997) 
 Escape from Camp Run-For-Your-Life (1997)
 Toy Terror: Batteries Included (1997)
 The Twisted Tale of Tiki Island (1997)
 Return to the Carnival of Horrors (1997)
 Zapped in Space (1997)
 Lost in Stinkeye Swamp (1997)
 Shop Til You Drop...Dead! (1998)
 Alone in Snakebite Canyon (1998)
 Checkout Time at the Dead-End Hotel (1998) 
 Night of a Thousand Claws (1998)
 Invaders from the Big Screen (1998)
 You’re Plant Food! (1998)
 The Werewolf of Twisted Tree Lodge (1998)
 It’s Only a Nightmare (1998)
 It Came from the Internet! (1999)
 Elevator to Nowhere (1999)
 Hocus-Pocus Horror (1999)
 Ship of Ghouls (1999)
 Escape from Horror House (1999)
 Into the Twister of Terror (1999)
 Scary Birthday to You (1999)
 Zombie School (1999)
 Danger Time (2000)
 All-Day Nightmare (2000)

Give Yourself Goosebumps: Special Edition 

 Into the Jaws of Doom (1998)
 Return to Terror Tower (1998)
 Trapped in the Circus of Fear (1998)
 One Night in Payne House (1998)
 The Curse of the Cave Creatures (1999)
 Revenge of the Body Squeezers (1999)
 Trick or...Trapped! (1999)
 Weekend at Poison Lake (1999)

Goosebumps Presents 

 The Girl Who Cried Monster (1996)
 The Cuckoo Clock of Doom (1996)
 Welcome to Camp Nightmare (1996)
 Return of the Mummy (1996)
 Night of the Living Dummy II (1996)
 My Hairiest Adventure (1996)
 The Headless Ghost (1996)
 Be Careful What You Wish For (1997)
 Go Eat Worms! (1997)
 Bad Hare Day (1997)
 Let’s Get Invisible! (1997)
 Attack of the Mutant (1997)
 Ghost Beach (1997)
 You Can’t Scare Me! (1997)
 Monster Blood (1997)
 Attack of the Jack-o’-Lanterns (1997)
 Calling All Creeps! (1997)
 Revenge of the Lawn Gnomes (1998)
 The Blob That Ate Everyone (1998)

Goosebumps Series 2000 
Cry of the Cat (1998)
Bride of the Living Dummy (1998)
Creature Teacher (1998)
Invasion of the Body Squeezers, Part I (1998)
Invasion of the Body Squeezers, Part II (1998)
I Am Your Evil Twin (1998)
Revenge R Us (1998)
Fright Camp (1998)
Are You Terrified Yet? (1998)
Headless Halloween (1998)
Attack of the Graveyard Ghouls (1998)
Brain Juice (1998)
Return to HorrorLand (1999)
Jekyll and Heidi (1999)
Scream School (1999)
The Mummy Walks (1999)
The Werewolf in the Living Room (1999)
Horrors of the Black Ring (1999)
Return to Ghost Camp (1999)
Be Afraid – Be Very Afraid! (1999)
The Haunted Car (1999)
Full Moon Fever (1999)
Slappy's Nightmare (1999)
Earth Geeks Must Go! (1999)
Ghost in the Mirror (2000)

Goosebumps HorrorLand 

 Welcome to HorrorLand: A Survival Guide (2009)
Revenge of the Living Dummy (2008)
Creep from the Deep (2008)
Monster Blood for Breakfast! (2008)
The Scream of the Haunted Mask (2008)
Dr. Maniac vs. Robby Schwartz (2008)
Who's Your Mummy? (2009)
My Friends Call Me Monster (2009)
Say Cheese – And Die Screaming! (2009)
Welcome to Camp Slither (2009)
Help! We Have Strange Powers! (2009)
Escape from HorrorLand (2009)
The Streets of Panic Park (2009)
When the Ghost Dog Howls (2010)
Little Shop of Hamsters (2010)
Heads, You Lose! (2010)
Weirdo Halloween (2010)
The Wizard Of Ooze (2010)
Slappy's New Year! (2010)
The Horror at Chiller House (2011)

Goosebumps HorrorLand: Hall of Horrors 
Claws! (2011)
Night of Giant Everything (2011)
The Five Masks of Dr. Screem (2011)
Why I Quit Zombie School (2011)
Don't Scream! (2011)
The Birthday Party of No Return (2011)

Goosebumps Most Wanted 
Planet of the Lawn Gnomes (2012)
Son of Slappy (2013)
How I Met My Monster (2013)
Frankenstein's Dog (2013)
Dr. Maniac Will See You Now (2013)
Creature Teacher: The Final Exam (2014)
A Nightmare on Clown Street (2015)
Night of the Puppet People (2015)
Here Comes The Shaggedy (2016)
Lizard of Oz (2016)

Goosebumps Most Wanted: Special Edition 
Zombie Halloween (2014)
The 12 Screams of Christmas (2014)
Trick or Trap (2015)
The Haunter (2016)

Goosebumps SlappyWorld 

 Slappy Birthday to You (2017)
 Attack of the Jack! (2017)
 I Am Slappy's Evil Twin (2017)
 Please Do Not Feed The Weirdo (2018)
 Escape From Shudder Mansion (2018)
 The Ghost of Slappy (2018)
 It's Alive! It's Alive! (2019)
 The Dummy Meets The Mummy! (2019)
 Revenge of the Invisible Boy (2019)
 Diary of a Dummy (2020)
 They Call Me the Night Howler (2020)
 My Friend Slappy (2020)
 Monster Blood Is Back (2021)
 Fifth Grade Zombies (2021)
 Judy and the Beast (2021)
 Slappy in Dreamland (2022)
 Haunting with the Stars (2022)
 Slappy Beware! (2022)
 Night of the Squawker (2023)

Fear Street
The New Girl (1989)
The Surprise Party (1989)
The Overnight (1989)
Missing (1990)
The Wrong Number (1990)
The Sleepwalker (1990)
Haunted (1990)
Halloween Party (1990)
The Stepsister (1990)
Ski Weekend (1991)
The Fire Game (1991)
Lights Out (1991)
The Secret Bedroom (1991)
The Knife (1991)
The Prom Queen (1992)
First Date (1992)
The Best Friend (1992)
The Cheater (1993)
Sunburn (1993)
The New Boy (1994)
The Dare (1994)
Bad Dreams (1994)
Double Date (1994)
The Thrill Club (1994)
One Evil Summer (1994)
The Mind Reader (1994)
Wrong Number 2 (1995)
Truth or Dare (1995)
Dead End (1995)
Final Grade (1995)
Switched (1995)
College Weekend (1995)
The Stepsister 2 (1995)
What Holly Heard (1996)
The Face (1996)
Secret Admirer (1996)
The Perfect Date (1996)
The Confession (1996)
The Boy Next Door (1996)
Night Games (1996)
Runaway (1997)
Killer's Kiss (1997)
All-Night Party (1997)
The Rich Girl (1997)
Cat (1997)
Fear Hall: The Beginning (1997)
Fear Hall: The Conclusion (1997)
Who Killed The Homecoming Queen? (1997)
Into The Dark (1997)
Best Friend 2 (1997)
Trapped (1997)

New Fear Street
The Stepbrother
Camp Out
Scream, Jennifer, Scream!
The Bad Girl

Fear Street Super Chiller
Party Summer
Silent Night
Goodnight Kiss
Broken Hearts
Silent Night 2
The Dead Lifeguard
Cheerleaders: The New Evil
Bad Moonlight
The New Year's Party
Goodnight Kiss 2
Silent Night 3
High Tide
Cheerleaders: The Evil Lives!

Cheerleaders
The First Evil
The Second Evil
The Third Evil
The New Evil
The Evil Lives!

The Fear Street Saga Trilogy
The Betrayal
The Secret
The Burning

99 Fear Street: The House of Evil
The First Horror
The Second Horror
The Third Horror

Cataluna Chronicles
The Evil Moon
The Dark Secret
The Deadly Fire

Fear Park
The First Scream
The Loudest Scream
The Last Scream

Fear Street Sagas

A New Fear
House of Whispers
Forbidden Secrets
The Sign of Fear
The Hidden Evil
Daughters of Silence
Children of Fear
Dance of Death
Heart of the Hunter
The Awakening Evil
Circle of Fire
Chamber of Fear
Faces of Terror
One Last Kiss
Door of Death
The Hand of Power

Fear Street Seniors
Let's Party
In Too Deep
The Thirst
No Answer
Last Chance
The Gift
Fight Team, Fight
Sweetheart, Evil Heart
Spring Break
Wicked
The Prom Date
Graduation Day

Fear Street Nights
Moonlight Secrets
Midnight Games
Darkest Dawn

A Fear Street Never 
Party Games
Don't Stay Up Late
The Lost Girl

Return to Fear Street 

 You May Now Kill The Bride
 The Wrong Girl
 Drop Dead Gorgeous

Ghosts of Fear Street (not written by R.L. Stine) 

Hide and Shriek
Who's Been Sleeping in My Grave?
The Attack of the Aqua Apes
Nightmare in 3-D
Stay Away from the Tree House
Eye of the Fortuneteller
Fright Knight
The Ooze
Revenge of the Shadow People
The Bugman Lives!
The Boy Who Ate Fear Street
Night of the Werecat
How to Be a Vampire
Body Switchers from Outer Space
Fright Christmas
Don't Ever Get Sick at Granny's
House of a Thousand Screams
Camp Fear Ghouls
Three Evil Wishes
Spell of the Screaming Jokers
The Creature from Club Lagoona
Field of Screams
Why I'm Not Afraid of Ghosts
Monster Dog
Halloween Bugs Me!
Go to Your Tomb – Right Now!
Parents from the 13th Dimension
Hide and Shriek II
The Tale of the Blue Monkey
I Was a Sixth-Grade Zombie
Escape of the He-Beast
Caution: Aliens at Work
Attack of the Vampire Worms
Horror Hotel Pt. 1: The Vampire Checks in
Horror Hotel Pt. 2: Ghost in the Guest Room
The Funhouse of Dr. Freek (Unreleased)

Mostly Ghostly

 Who Let the Ghosts Out? (2004) (Made into a film in 2008)
 Have You Met My Ghoulfriend? (2004) (Made into a film in 2014)
 One Night in Doom House (2005) (Made into a film in 2016)
 Little Camp of Horrors (2005)
 Ghouls Gone Wild! (2005)
 Let's Get This Party Haunted! (2005)
 Freaks and Shrieks (2005)
 Don't Close Your Eyes! (2006)

Rotten School (2005-2008)

The Big Blueberry Barf-Off!
The Great Smelling Bee
The Good, the Bad and the Very Slimy
Lose, Team, Lose!
Shake, Rattle and Hurl!
The Heinie Prize
Dudes, the School is Haunted!
The Teacher from Heck
Party Poopers
The Rottenest Angel
Punk'd and Skunked
Battle of the Dum Diddys
Got Cake?
Night of the Creepy Things
Calling All Birdbrains
Dumb Clucks

The Nightmare Room

Don't Forget Me!
Locker 13
My Name is Evil
Liar Liar
Dear Diary, I'm Dead
They Call Me Creature
The Howler
Shadow Girl
Camp Nowhere
Full Moon Halloween
Scare School
Visitors

The Nightmare Room Thrillogy (2001)
Fear Games
What Scares You the Most?
No Survivors

Space Cadets 
Jerks-in-Training (1991)
Losers in Space (1991)
Bozos on Patrol (1992)

Hark
The Badlands of Hark (1985)
The Invaders of Hark (1985)

Dangerous Girls
Dangerous Girls (2003)
The Taste of Night (2003)
Bitten (2010) (a combination of the prior two books into one)

Just Beyond (graphic novel series) 

 The Scare School (2019)
 The Horror At Happy Landings (2020)
 Welcome To Beast Island (2020)
 Monstrosity (2021)

Stand-alone novels
Phone Calls (1990)
Curtains (1990)
The Beast (1994)
The Beast 2 (1995)
Superstitious (1996) (Stine's first hardcover horror novel)
It Came From Ohio!: My Life As A Writer (1997)
Three Faces of Me (2000)
Zombie Town (2000)
The Adventures of Shrinkman (2000)
The 13th Warning (2000)
My Alien Parents (2000)
The Sitter (2003)
Haunted Lighthouse (2003) (based on a 4D movie experience at Sea World)
Eye Candy (2004) (made into a 2015 TV series on MTV starring Victoria Justice)
It's the First Day of School...Forever! (2011) 
No Rest For The Dead (2011) (Stine was one of 26 writers in this collaborative mystery novel) 
Red Rain (2013) (Stine's second hardcover horror novel)
A Midsummer Night's Scream (2014)
Little Shop Of Monsters (2015) (children's picturebook)
Young Scrooge (2016)
Mary McScary (2017) (children's picturebook)

Anthologies
The Nightmare Hour (2000)
The Haunting Hour (2002) (made into direct-to-DVD movie in 2007 and a tv series that aired from 2010 to 2014)
Beware! (2004) (editor)
Temptation (2012)
Scream and Scream Again (2018) (editor)
 Stinetinglers (2022)

Rainy Night Theater Podcast short stories 

 "The Head Start" (2016)
 "Welcome To My Nightmare" (2016)
"Lucky at Cards" (2016)
"Don't Open The Box" (2016)
"How To Color A Monster" (2016)
"The Terror After School" (2017)
"The Kid Behind the Door" (2017)
"Curse of the Smiling Mummy" (2017)
"Can You Keep a Secret?" (2017)
"Do Some Damage!" (2017)

Short stories (from other anthologies) 
"The Spell" (1991) from Scary: Stories That Will Make You Scream and 13: Tales of Horror
"The Surprise Guest" (2002) from Beware!
"Joe Is Not A Monster" (2002) from Beware!
"The House Of No Return" (2002) from Scary 2: More Stores That Will Make You Scream
"Wifey" (2006) from Death Do Us Part
"My Worst Nightmare" (2009) from Half Minute Horrors
"The Wrong Room" (2009) from Twilight Zone: 19 Original Stories on the 50th Anniversary
"Roomful Of Witnesses" (2009) from Thriller 2
"The Three Eyed Man" (2010) from Bones: Terrifying Tales to Haunt Your Dreams
"Funny Things" (2011) from What You Wish For: A Book On Darfur
"High Stakes" (2013) from The Mystery Box
"Gaslighted" (2015) from Faceoff
"Disappear!" (2015) from Guys Read: Terrifying Tales
"The Old Radio" (2016) from Scary Out There 
"The Demon Room" (2019) (comic) from Shock Volume 2
"The Ghost In Sam's Closet" (2020) from Don't Turn Out The Lights
"Hope I Don't See A Ghost" (2022) from Hope Wins: A Collection Of Inspiring Stories For Young Readers

Books written under the name Jovial Bob Stine
How to Be Funny (1978)
The Absurdly Silly Encyclopaedia and Fly Swatter (1978)
Going Out! Going Steady! Going Bananas! (1979)
Dynamite's Funny Book of the Sad Facts of Life (1980)
The Sick of Being Sick Book (1980)
Pigs' Book of World Records (1980)
Complete Book Of Nerds (1980)
Gnasty Gnomes (1981)
Cool Kids' Guide to Summer Camp (1981)
Don't Stand in the Soup (1982)
The Great Superman Movie Book (1982)
Bored Of Being Bored: How To Beat The Boredom Blahs (1982)
Blips: The First Book of Videogame Funnies (1983)
Everything You Need To Survive Money Problems (1983)
Everything You Need To Survive Money Problems (1983)
Jovial Bob's Computer Joke Book (1985)
Masters of the Universe: Demons of the Deep (1985)
The Madballs Handbook (1986)
101 Silly Monster Jokes (1986)
Miami Mice (1986)
Doggone Dog Joke Book (1987)
Spaceballs: The Book (1987)
101 Wacky Kid Jokes (1988)
You Know It's Going to Be A Long School Year When... (1988)
Big Top Pee-wee Movie Storybook (1988)
Look out! Here Comes The Raisin-Busters (1988)
Pork and Beans: Play Date (1989)
My Secret Identity (1989)
Ghostbusters II Storybook (1989)
Amazing Adventure of Me, Myself and I (1990)
The Good News, Bad News Joke Book (1990)
101 School Cafeteria Jokes
101 Creepy Creatures Jokes
101 Vacation Jokes (1990)
Exploring Humorous Fiction (1992)

Books written under the name Zachary Blue
The Protectors #1: The Petrova Twist (1987)
The Protectors #2: The Jet Fighter Trap (1987)

Comic books
Man-Thing (2019)

Contributions to other series

Crosswinds
Crosswinds #21: Broken Date (1988)
Crosswinds #32: How I Broke Up With Ernie (1990)

Twist-a-plot
The Time Raider (1982)
Golden Sword of Dragonwalk (1983)
Horrors of the Haunted Museum (1983)
Instant Millionaire (1984)

Find Your Fate
Indiana Jones and the Curse of Horror Island (1984)
Indiana Jones and the Giants of the Silver Tower (1984)
Indiana Jones and the Cult of the Mummy's Crypt (1985)
James Bond in Win, Place or Die (1985)
Indiana Jones and the Ape Slaves of Howling Island (1986)

Find Your Fate Junior: Golden Girl
Golden Girl and the Vanishing Unicorn (1986)

Advanced Dungeons And Dragons Storybook 

 The Forest Of Enchantment

Wizards, Warriors and You
The Forest of Twisted Dreams (1984)
The Siege of the Dragonriders (as Eric Affabee) (1984)
Challenge of the Wolf Knight (1985)
The Dragon Queen's Revenge (as Eric Affabee) (1986)
The Impostor King (1986)
Cavern of the Phantoms (1986)
Attack on the King (as Eric Affabee) (1986)

G.I. Joe: Find Your Fate
Operation: Star Raider (as Eric Affabee) (1985)
Operation: Deadly Decoy (1986)
Operation: Mindbender (1986)
Serpentor and the Mummy Warrior (1987)

G.I. Joe

Siege of Serpentor (1988)
Jungle Raid (1988)

Horror High
Horror High #3: Grave Intentions
Horror High #4: Fatal Kiss 
Horror High #6: Deadly Rumours

Point Horror

Blind Date (1986)
Twisted (1987)
The Babysitter (1989)
Beach Party (1990)
The Boyfriend (1990)
The Babysitter II (1991)
The Girlfriend (1991)
The Snowman (1991)
Beach House (1992)
Hit and Run (1992)
The Hitchhiker (1992)
Halloween Night (1993)
The Babysitter III (1993)
The Dead Girlfriend (1993)
Call Waiting (1994)
Halloween Night II (1994)
I Saw You That Night! (1994)
The Babysitter IV (1995)
Summer Sizzlers (1995) (Point Romance Short Story Anthology)

Garbage Pail Kids 

 Welcome To Smellville (2020)
 Thrills and Chills (2021)
 Camp Daze (2021)

See also 
 Dynamite (magazine)
 Weird fiction
 Children's literature

Explanatory notes

Citations

External links

R.L Stine on Wattpad

 
Jovial Bob Stine at LC Authorities, with 17 records, and at WorldCat

 
1943 births
Living people
20th-century American novelists
21st-century American novelists
American children's writers
American fantasy writers
American horror writers
American male novelists
American male short story writers
American male screenwriters
American science fiction writers
Bexley High School alumni
Dark fantasy writers
Ghost story writers
Inkpot Award winners
Jewish American writers
Novelists from Ohio
Ohio State University College of Arts and Sciences alumni
People from Greater Columbus, Ohio
Writers from Columbus, Ohio
Weird fiction writers
20th-century American male writers
21st-century American male writers
20th-century pseudonymous writers
21st-century pseudonymous writers